Nicolas Peifer (born 13 October 1990, in Strasbourg) is a French wheelchair tennis player. In doubles, Peifer has completed the career Super Slam, having won all four majors, a Paralympic gold medal in 2016, and the Wheelchair Tennis Masters over the course of his career.

In 2007 Peifer won the Junior Masters.

Grand Slam wins

Doubles 

 French Open: 2011 (w/ Kunieda), 2017 (w/ Houdet)
 US Open: 2011 (w/ Houdet)
 Wimbledon: 2015 (w/ Fernández)
 Australian Open: 2018 (w/ Houdet)

References

External links
 
 
 

1990 births
Living people
French male tennis players
Wheelchair tennis players
Paralympic wheelchair tennis players of France
Paralympic gold medalists for France
Paralympic silver medalists for France
Paralympic medalists in wheelchair tennis
Wheelchair tennis players at the 2008 Summer Paralympics
Wheelchair tennis players at the 2012 Summer Paralympics
Wheelchair tennis players at the 2016 Summer Paralympics
Wheelchair tennis players at the 2020 Summer Paralympics
Medalists at the 2012 Summer Paralympics
Medalists at the 2016 Summer Paralympics
People from Sarreguemines
Sportspeople from Moselle (department)
21st-century French people